Poiana is a village in Șoldănești District, Moldova.

References

Villages of Șoldănești District
Populated places on the Dniester